Zach Dean (born January 4, 2003) is a Canadian junior ice hockey centre for the Gatineau Olympiques of the Quebec Major Junior Hockey League (QMJHL) as a prospect to the St. Louis Blues of the National Hockey League (NHL). He was drafted in the first round, 30th overall, by the Vegas Golden Knights in the 2021 NHL Entry Draft.

Playing career
Dean played minor ice hockey in Mount Pearl, Newfoundland and Labrador. On August 19, 2019, signed with the Gatineau Olympiques of the Quebec Major Junior Hockey League (QMJHL). During the 2019–20 season he was named to the QMJHL All-Rookie Team. Dean was selected by the Vegas Golden Knights with the 30th overall pick in the 2021 NHL Entry Draft, and signed a three-year, entry-level contract on December 2, 2021. While playing with the Olympiques in the 2022–23 season, Dean was traded by the Golden Knights to the St. Louis Blues in exchange for Ivan Barbashev on February 26, 2023.

International play

 

Dean appeared for the Canada Black team at the 2019 World U-17 Hockey Challenge, recording five points in seven games.

On December 12, 2022, Dean was named to Team Canada to compete at the 2023 World Junior Ice Hockey Championships. During the tournament he recorded one goal and two assists in seven games and won a gold medal.

Career statistics

Regular season and playoffs

International

Awards and honours

References

External links
 

2003 births
Living people
Canadian ice hockey centres
Gatineau Olympiques players
Ice hockey people from Alberta
National Hockey League first-round draft picks
People from Grande Prairie
Vegas Golden Knights draft picks